Pasiene Manor is a manor in Pasiene Parish, Zilupe Municipality in the historical region of Latgale, in Latvia.

History 
In the 17th century Pasiene Manor belonged to Demkin, who built the first manor house.  In the 18th century the Augustus III of Poland gifted the Pasiene estate to the Chief Chancellor Jānis Borhs, who built the Pasiene Catholic Church. At the end of the 18th century estate was acquired by Benislavski nobile family. Pasiene Manor house was built in the 1850s by the landlord Benislavski for his daughter S. Tehanovecka. In 19th century Manor was sold to Prince M. Obolensky. The last owner of the estate was countess Obolenska. After the war main tenant at Pasiene Manor was Pasiene elementary school. Presently manor house is privatized and needs renovation. It still serves as parish folk house, has library and a room used by  Polish Society.

See also
List of palaces and manor houses in Latvia

References

Manor houses in Latvia